The Multiple Sclerosis Trust (MS Trust) is an independent, national UK charity that was established in 1993.

The MS Trust works to provide information for anyone affected by multiple sclerosis, education programmes for health professionals, funding for practical research and campaigns for specialist MS services.

The Trust is based in the Spirella Building in Letchworth Garden City.

Information service 

The MS Trust provides an Information Service for all people affected by MS (Information Service).

It also publishes a range of books, factsheets and DVDs on aspects of the condition.  These include a DVD of exercises led by Mr Motivator.

Campaigns 

Campaigning is based on promoting access for people with MS to high quality specialist services

Recent campaigns have included:
 Supporting MS specialist nurses whose posts are threatened
 Monitoring the implementation of the NICE clinical guidelines for MS
 Campaigning for access to licensed symptomatic and disease modifying treatments.

Research 

The MS Trust has funded practical research which will improve services and therapies available for people with MS. Research currently being funded includes:
 University of Bristol, Bone marrow cell treatment for chronic multiple sclerosis
 Therapists in MS group, Pilates based core stability training
 University Hospital Birmingham and West Berkshire Community Hospital, A group fatigue management programme

Fundraising 

The MS Trust receives more than half of its income from personal donations, legacies and Christmas card sales.  The Trust has several ongoing fundraising projects, including parachuting, runs, and overseas treks.

Patrons 
 Edith Rifkind
 Laurence and Jackie Llewelyn Bowen
Sir John Harvey-Jones was President of the Trust from 2001 to 2008.

References

External links
 MS Trust website
 

Health charities in the United Kingdom
Multiple sclerosis organizations
Organizations established in 1993
Organisations based in Hertfordshire